Polasanipalle is a village in Eluru district in the state of Andhra Pradesh in India. The nearest railway station is located at Nuzvid (NZD) at a distance of 11.54 Km.

Demographics

 India census, Polasanipalle has a population of 4890 of which 2122 are males while 2768 are females. Average Sex Ratio is 1304. Child population is 476 which makes up 9.73% of total population of village with sex ratio 889. In 2011, literacy rate of the village was 72.84% when compared to 67.02% of Andhra Pradesh.

See also 
 Eluru district

References 

Villages in Eluru district